WBGX (1570 AM) is a radio station broadcasting a gospel format. Located in Harvey, Illinois, United States, it serves the Chicago area.  The station is currently owned by Great Lakes Radio-Chicago, LLC.

WBGX is a locally owned radio station that brokers time to churches in order to serve the Chicago and South Suburban areas.

History
The station began broadcasting in 1955, and held the call sign WBEE. It aired an R&B format, and ran 250 watts during daytime hours only. In 1956, its power was increased to 1,000 watts. In 1968, WBEE adopted an all-jazz format. On September 28, 1989, its call sign was changed to WMNN, and it began airing ten minutes of financial news at the top of the hour, as an affiliate of Money Network Radio. However, its call sign was changed back to WBEE on November 15, 1989.

In October 2003, Great Lakes Radio purchased the station for $2.2 million from owner Charles Sherrell, and its call sign was changed to WBGX. The station switched to a gospel music format. During the following months the entire station was rebuilt. A new tower was added to increase power to serve a larger population. A new building on the corner of 60th and S. Michigan Ave was purchased in December 2003, and new studio was built which opened in May 2004. Gospel Industry Specialist Veronica Williams was the only staff member retained.

In summer 2020, former Cook County Board President Todd Stroger and Maze Jackson joined WBGX as morning hosts, after leaving WVON when they were told by station management that they could no longer discuss Mayor Lori Lightfoot, and to disconnect any callers who were critical of her.

References

External links

BGX
Gospel radio stations in the United States
Harvey, Illinois
Radio stations established in 1955
1955 establishments in Illinois
BGX